Anton Mohr (8 February 1890 – 14 September 1968) was a Norwegian geographer and historian.

He was born in Fana to merchant and consul Conrad Mohr and Agnete Kroepelien, and was a brother of Wilhelm Mohr. He was a central person in the establishment of the Norwegian School of Economics, and was appointed professor of political history at the institution from 1946 to 60. His works include his thesis Kampen om Nilen from 1923, Kampen om oljen from 1925, Norges Kornforsyning inntil 1914 from 1954, and De 50 statene (1959). He wrote three books on the Napoleonic era, Keiseren av Elba, De hundrede dager and  Mot Sankt Helena. He was decorated Knight, First Class of the Order of St. Olav in 1960, and was a Commander of the Order of the Crown of Italy and Knight of the French Legion of Honour.

References

1890 births
1968 deaths
Norwegian geographers
20th-century Norwegian historians
Academic staff of the Norwegian School of Economics
Chevaliers of the Légion d'honneur
20th-century geographers